Senator Turner may refer to:

Members of the Northern Irish Senate
William George Turner (1872–1937), Northern Irish Senator from 1923 to 1929

Members of the United States Senate
George Turner (American politician) (1850–1932), U.S. Senator from Washington from 1897 to 1903
James Turner (North Carolina politician) (1766–1824), U.S. Senator from North Carolina from 1805 to 1816

United States state senate members
Bennie Turner (1948–2012), Mississippi State Senate
Clarence W. Turner (1866–1939), Tennessee State Senate
Dan W. Turner (1877–1969), Iowa State Senate
Harvey G. Turner (1822–1893), Wisconsin State Senate
Henry E. Turner (New York politician) (1832–1911), New York State Senate
James M. Turner (1928–1981), New Jersey State Senate
James Turner (Maryland politician) (1783–1861), Maryland State Senate
Jim Turner (politician) (born 1946), Texas State Senate
John F. Turner (born 1942), Wyoming State Senate
Johnny Ray Turner (born 1949), Kentucky State Senate
Joseph Turner (Wisconsin politician) (died 1874), Wisconsin State Senate
Josiah Turner (1821–1901), North Carolina State Senate
Karl Turner (American politician) (born 1942), Maine State Senate
Loyce W. Turner (1927–2021), Georgia State Senate
Nina Turner (born 1967), Ohio State Senate
Oscar Turner (1825–1896), Kentucky State Senate
Peter H. Turner (1813–1885), Wisconsin State Senate
Richard C. Turner (1927–1986), Iowa State Senate
Shirley Turner (born 1941), New Jersey State Senate
Wilfred D. Turner (1855–1933), North Carolina State Senate
William H. Turner (politician) (1931–2002), Florida State Senate

See also
Senator Turney (disambiguation)